Dybowski's frog (Rana dybowskii) is a species of true frog found in Northeast Asia. It is found in the Russian Far East, the Korean Peninsula, and the Japanese island of Tsushima. It may also exist in northeastern China, but this has not been confirmed.

The Dybowski's frog is fairly tolerant of human disturbance; however, it has been threatened across portions of its range due to heavy collection for use in traditional Chinese medicine. It breeds in slow-moving and stagnant water, and when not breeding, is most commonly found in woodlands. The species covers a wide range of altitudes, from sea level to 900 m, and possibly higher.

The head and body are relatively broad; the skin is generally smooth, but with some small protuberances along the back. The male has a pair of vocal sacs which are used during the mating season. The back is largely tan to dark brown, and the belly is white.

References

Rana (genus)
Amphibians described in 1876
Taxa named by Albert Günther
Amphibians of Japan
Amphibians of Korea
Amphibians of Russia